The Zopfiaceae are a family of fungi in the order Pleosporales. Taxa have a widespread distribution, and appear to be saprobic, found largely on rhizomes and roots. Some species are found in marine environments.

References

Pleosporales
Dothideomycetes families
Taxa named by David Leslie Hawksworth
Taxa described in 1992